Vladimir "Vlado" Marković (born 26 August 1985) is a Bosnian-Herzegovinian professional football defender.

Club career
Born in Bijeljina (SR Bosnia and Herzegovina, SFR Yugoslavia), he played in Macedonian Prva Liga club FK Pobeda before moving, in 2007, to Serbian Superliga club OFK Beograd, where he stayed one season. In summer 2008, he was back to Bosnia to play in the Premier League of Bosnia and Herzegovina club FK Borac Banja Luka, but next winter, he moved to FK Slavija Sarajevo. In summer 2009, he moved back to FK Pobeda. During the 2009-10 winter break he signed for KF Skënderbeu Korçë in the Albanian Superliga where he played until summer 2011, when he moved to another Albanian top flight club, KF Teuta Durrës. In the winter break of the 2011-12 season he moved to Hungary and signed with Nemzeti Bajnokság I club Pécsi Mecsek FC. In summer 2012 he returned to Bosnia and signed with Premier League side NK Čelik Zenica. In the following summer he moved to newly promoted FK Mladost Velika Obarska.

References

External links
 
 Stats from 2014/15 season at Mladost Gacko at FSRS
 Stats from 2014/15 season at FK Leotar at FSRS

1985 births
Living people
People from Bijeljina
Serbs of Bosnia and Herzegovina
Association football defenders
Bosnia and Herzegovina footballers
FK Pobeda players
OFK Beograd players
FK Borac Banja Luka players
FK Slavija Sarajevo players
KF Skënderbeu Korçë players
KF Teuta Durrës players
Pécsi MFC players
NK Čelik Zenica players
FK Mladost Velika Obarska players
FK Leotar players
FK Mladost Gacko players
Macedonian First Football League players
Serbian SuperLiga players
Premier League of Bosnia and Herzegovina players
Kategoria Superiore players
Nemzeti Bajnokság I players
First League of the Republika Srpska players
Bosnia and Herzegovina expatriate footballers
Expatriate footballers in North Macedonia
Expatriate footballers in Serbia
Expatriate footballers in Albania
Expatriate footballers in Hungary
Bosnia and Herzegovina expatriate sportspeople in North Macedonia
Bosnia and Herzegovina expatriate sportspeople in Albania
Bosnia and Herzegovina expatriate sportspeople in Serbia
Bosnia and Herzegovina expatriate sportspeople in Hungary